WWE Aftershock is a professional wrestling video game released exclusively on the N-Gage in 2005.

Development
The game was announced by Nokia in collaboration with THQ and WWE on August 3, 2004. It was originally scheduled to release in the fourth quarter of 2004, then February 2005, and then later on March 22, 2005.

Gameplay 
There are five main events and Survival (multiple enemies at the same time), King of the Ring(ladder tournament), and Tag Team(two versus two) match options. WWE Aftershock includes 12 WWE superstars, such as John Cena. The game features two-player contests through Bluetooth and the N-Gage Arena. Two of the twelve wrestlers are unlockable by winning the King of the Ring and playing in two-player contests. The AI controls two of the wrestlers in multiplayer King of the Ring. Attacs include hits, grapples, and Irish whips. Submission holds are available after a takedown. Each character has four front grapples and ground grapples, and his signature move or hold. Every button is assigned one action. The wrestlers grapple in a 3D arena. Wrestlers have entrance music.

Reception

The game received "mixed" reviews according to video game review aggregator Metacritic.

GameSpot rated the game a 5.3 of 10 stating "WWE Aftershock may be the only wrestling game available on the N-Gage, but that alone doesn't make it a good value."

See also

 List of licensed wrestling video games
 List of fighting games

References

2005 video games
Exient Entertainment games
Multiplayer and single-player video games
N-Gage games
Professional wrestling games
THQ games
Video games developed in the United Kingdom
WWE video games